Angel Hermida (born 25 February 1967) is a Spanish handball player. He competed in the men's tournament at the 1992 Summer Olympics.

References

External links
 

1967 births
Living people
Spanish male handball players
Olympic handball players of Spain
Handball players at the 1992 Summer Olympics
Sportspeople from Madrid
Handball players from the Community of Madrid